Plethodus is an extinct genus of prehistoric ray-finned fish.

References

Cretaceous bony fish
Prehistoric ray-finned fish genera
Tselfatiiformes
Cretaceous fish of Africa